Petr Oliva (born 23 October 1987), is a Czech futsal player who plays for Slavia Prague and the Czech Republic national futsal team.

References

External links
UEFA profile

1987 births
Living people
Czech men's futsal players